Kron Gracie (born July 11, 1988) is a Brazilian-American mixed martial artist, submission grappler and black belt Brazilian jiu-jitsu (BJJ) practitioner and instructor.

A member of the Gracie Family of Brazilian jiu-jitsu, he is the son of 9th deg. BJJ red belt Rickson Gracie and a grandson of BJJ co founder Hélio Gracie. Training jiu-jitsu from a very young age Gracie became a two-time IBJJF World champion and four-time Pan-American champion before receiving his black belt at the age of 19. By 2008 Gracie held a record of 51 consecutive matches won by submission at high level tournaments. After medalling at the Pan-American championship, Gracie became European champion in 2009, World championship silver medallist in 2011 and in 2013 ADCC Submission Fighting World Champion.

In 2014 Gracie announced that he was transitioning to mixed martial arts (MMA). Competing under the Japanese Rizin Fighting Federation before signing up with the Ultimate Fighting Championship (UFC), Gracie holds a 5-1 record for a total of six professional fights, with all of his wins coming by way of submission. Gracie's last professional fight took place at UFC Fight Night 161 on 12 October 2019.

Early life 
Gracie was born in Rio de Janeiro, Brazil the youngest son of Brazilian Jiu-Jitsu (BJJ) master Rickson Gracie but lived most of his life in Los Angeles after his father moved to California in 1989. He began his BJJ training under his father as a child, winning his first competition as a yellow belt at the age of ten. Kron is the youngest of four children to Rickson Gracie and grandson of the late Helio Gracie. He has two older sisters Kauan and Kaulin, his older brother Rockson died in 2000.

Brazilian jiu-jitsu career

2005–2007: First world and Pan Am championships titles 
At the age of 16, competing as a blue belt in the Adult lightweight division, Gracie won the 2004 IBJJF American National Jiu-Jitsu Championship. After receiving his purple belt Gracie won the 2005 Pan Championship then in 2006, Gracie won both the IBJJF World Championship and the CBJJO World Jiu-Jitsu Cup. Competing in grappling Gracie won the 2006 NAGA Championship in the Adult Lightweight Division. The following year as a brown belt, he became world champion for the second time and Pan American champion for the fourth time winning double gold, in his division and, after defeating Tom DeBlass, in absolute (aka open class). At that point Gracie held a record 51-match submission streak.

2008–2010: Black belt, European champion, ADCC medallist 
In 2008, at the age of 19, Gracie was promoted to black belt by his father a week before the World Championship, however Gracie was submitted by Sergio Moraes in the first match of the middleweight division. In 2009 Gracie won the European Championship after defeating Yan Cabral in the final, a few days after the death of his grandfather, Grandmaster Helio Gracie, he then won silver at the 2009 Pan Championship in the middleweight division after losing by points in the final against Lucas Leite. At the 2009 Abu Dhabi Combat Club (ADCC) grappling competition in Barcelona, the most prestigious grappling tournament in the world, Gracie lost the  Quarter-final after being submitted via mounted guillotine choke by Marcelo Garcia. Two years later Gracie won bronze at 2011 ADCC World after losing again to Marcelo Garcia in a close match after Garcia won by points. Gracie became known as "Ice Cream Kron" due to his calm demeanour when fighting.

2011–2013: Superfights, ADCC World champion 
Gracie won silver at the 2011 World Jiu-Jitsu Championship, in the lightweight division, submitting Leandro Lo then losing 9-2 to Gilbert "Durinho" Burns in the finals. At 2012 Pan Am, competing under Rickson Gracie BJJ team, Gracie won bronze in middleweight and bronze in absolute after losing in the final against ultra heavyweight Marcus "Buchecha" Almeida; that same year he became World Jiu-Jitsu Expo Superfight champion after defeating Victor Estima in a tight match won by advantage at the World Jiu Jitsu Expo in Long Beach, California. In October 2012 Gracie participated in a Gi Superfight at Metamoris 1 in San Diego, submitting Otávio Souza at seventeen minutes of Round 1 by armbar.

In June 2013 Gracie participated in a No-gi Superfight at Metamoris 2 in Los Angeles, defeating Japanese MMA star Shinya Aoki by guillotine choke in seven minutes. In October 2013 Gracie won his division of the ADCC World Championship in Beijing submitting all his opponents including Garry Tonon in the Quarter-final, JT Torres in the Semi-final and Otávio Souza submitted by guillotine choke in the Final.

Mixed martial arts career

2014–2016: Japanese debut, Rizin Fighting 
On February 24, 2014, Gracie announced his intention to pursue an MMA career. Gracie chose to cut down weight to compete at  instead of his usual  jiu-jitsu and grappling weight class. He started training for his first MMA bout with the California based Scrap Pack, a group of fighters comprising Cesar Gracie Jiu-Jitsu students Gilbert Melendez, Nick and Nate Diaz. Gracie won the fight via armbar, sixty-five seconds into the first round.

Gracie fought on December 31, 2015 at Rizin Fighting Federation World Tournament. He faced Asen Yamamoto and won the fight by submission via triangle choke in the first round. Gracie fought Hideo Tokoro on September 25, 2016. He won via rear-naked choke in the first round.

Gracie faced MMA veteran Tatsuya Kawajiri at the Rizin Fighting Federation Grand Prix: Final Round event on December 31, 2016. He won via rear-naked choke in the second round. This improved his professional MMA record to 4-0.

2018–present: Ultimate Fighting Championship 
In November 2018, Gracie was signed by the UFC. In his debut fight for the promotion, Gracie faced Alex Caceres on February 17, 2019 at UFC on ESPN 1. He won the fight via submission due to a rear-naked choke in the first round. This fight earned him his first Performance of the Night award.

Gracie faced Cub Swanson on October 12, 2019 at UFC on ESPN+ 19. He lost the fight via unanimous decision. This fight earned him the Fight of the Night bonus award. Many people were confused at Gracie's decision to strike with Swanson instead of taking the fight to the ground where he was predicted to have the advantage. In the years since, several members of the Gracie family have spoken about his loss and criticized his decision to avoid grappling, including his father Rickson and uncle Relson Gracie.

Gracie is scheduled to make his return at UFC 288 on May 6, 2023 against Charles Jourdain.

Instructor lineage 
Kano Jigoro → Mitsuyo "Count Koma" Maeda → Carlos Gracie → Helio Gracie → Rickson Gracie → Kron Gracie

Championships and achievements

Brazilian jiu-jitsu 
Main Achievements (at black belt level):

 IBJJF European Champion (2009)
 2nd Place IBJJF World Championship (2011)
 2nd Place IBJJF Pans Championship (2009)
 3rd Place IBJJF Pans Championship (2012)

Main Achievements (at colored belts):

 IBJJF World Champion (2006 purple, 2007 brown)
 CBJJO World Jiu-Jitsu Cup Champion (2006 purple)
 Copa Pacifica de Jiu Jitsu Champion (2007)
 IBJJF Pan American Champion (2005 purple, 2007/2008 brown)
 IBJJF American National (2004 blue)
 South Bay Open Jiu-Jitsu Champion (2006)

Submission grappling 

2013 ADCC Submission Fighting World Championship – 1st Place – Under 77 kg Division
2011 ADCC Submission Wrestling Championships – 3rd Place – Under 77 kg Division
2008 Rickson Gracie Cup – 1st Place – Adult Middleweight Division – Brown Belt, 1st Place – Adult Open Division – Brown Belt
2006 Naga Championships – 1st Place – Adult Lightweight Division – Purple Belt
2006 6th Annual Gracie United Tournament – 1st Place.
2006 NAGA Chicago Championship – 1st Place.

Mixed martial arts 
Ultimate Fighting Championship
Performance of the Night (One time) vs. Alex Caceres
Fight of the Night (One time) vs. Cub Swanson

Grappling record 
{| class="wikitable sortable" style="font-size:80%; text-align:left;"
|-
| colspan=9 style="text-align:center;" | 40 Matches, 29 Wins (24 Submissions), 11 Losses (3 Submissions)
|-
!  Result
!  Rec.
!  Opponent
!  Method
!  text-center|  Event
!  Division
!  Type
!  Date
!  Location
|-
|Win|| style="text-align:center;"|28-11 ||  Otávio Souza|| Submission (guillotine choke) || rowspan=4|ADCC World Championship || rowspan=4|-77kg|| rowspan=4|Nogi|| rowspan=2| || rowspan=4| Beijing
|-
|Win|| style="text-align:center;"|27-11 ||  Jonathan Torres|| Submission (armbar)
|-
|Win|| style="text-align:center;"|26-11 ||  Garry Tonon|| Submission (rear naked choke) || rowspan=2|
|-
|Win|| style="text-align:center;"|25-11 ||  Andy Wang|| Technical Submission (rear naked choke)
|-
|Win|| style="text-align:center;"|24-11 ||  Shinya Aoki|| Submission (guillotine choke) || Metamoris 2 || Superfight||Nogi||  ||  Los Angeles, CA
|-
|Win|| style="text-align:center;"|23-11 ||  Otávio Souza|| Submission (armbar) || Metamoris 1 || Superfight||Gi||  ||  Los Angeles, CA
|-
|Win|| style="text-align:center;"| 22-11||  Gabriel Rollo|| Points (4-4 ADV) ||rowspan=2| IBJJF World Championship||rowspan=2| -82kg||rowspan=2|Gi||  || rowspan=2| Long Beach, CA
|-
|Win|| style="text-align:center;"|21-11||  Elan Santiago|| Submission (choke)|| 
|-
|Win|| style="text-align:center;"|20-11 ||  Victor Estima|| Points || World Jiu-Jitsu Expo|| Superfight||Gi||  ||  Long Beach, CA
|-
|Loss||  style="text-align:center;"|19-11||  Zak Maxwell|| Points (0-4) || rowspan=2|ACBJJ World Trials || rowspan=2|-77kg|| rowspan=2|Gi|| rowspan=2| || rowspan=2| San Diego, CA
|-
|Win|| style="text-align:center;"|19-10||  Beneil Dariush|| Referee Decision
|-
|Loss||  style="text-align:center;"|18-10||  Victor Estima|| Points (2-6) ||rowspan=7| IBJJF Pan Championship||rowspan=3| -82kg||rowspan=7|Gi||rowspan=2|  || rowspan=7| Long Beach, CA
|-
|Win|| style="text-align:center;"|18-9||  Jake Mackenzie|| Submission (choke)
|-
|Win|| style="text-align:center;"|17-9||  Carlos Ribeiro|| Submission (choke)|| rowspan=5| 
|-
|Loss|| style="text-align:center;"|16-9||  Marcus Almeida|| Submission (kneebar) ||rowspan=4|Absolute
|-
|Win|| style="text-align:center;"|16-8||  Victor Estima|| Disqualification
|-
|Win|| style="text-align:center;"|15-8||  Ricardo Evangelista|| Submission (footlock)
|-
|Win|| style="text-align:center;"|14-8||  David Gill|| Submission (choke)
|-
|Win|| style="text-align:center;"|13-8 ||  Claudio Calasans|| Submission (guillotine choke) || rowspan=4|ADCC World Championship || rowspan=4|-77kg|| rowspan=4|Nogi|| rowspan=2| || rowspan=4| Nottingham
|-
|Loss||  style="text-align:center;"|12-8||  Marcelo Garcia|| Points (0-2)
|-
|Win|| style="text-align:center;"|12-7 ||  Murilo Santana|| Submission (guillotine choke)|| rowspan=2|
|-
|Win|| style="text-align:center;"|11-7 ||  Jason Manly|| Submission (guillotine choke)
|-
|Loss||  style="text-align:center;"|10-7||  Gilbert Burns|| Points (2-9) ||rowspan=4| IBJJF World Championship||rowspan=4| -82kg||rowspan=4|Gi||rowspan=3|  || rowspan=4| Long Beach, CA
|-
|Win|| style="text-align:center;"|10-6||  Leandro Lo|| Submission (choke)
|-
|Win|| style="text-align:center;"|9-6||  Rafael Barbosa|| Submission (choke)
|-
|Win|| style="text-align:center;"|8-6||  Sergio Rodrigo|| Submission (guillotine choke) ||
|-
|Loss||  style="text-align:center;"|7-6||  Sergio Moraes|| Points (4-4 ADV) || IBJJF World Championship|| -82kg||Gi||  ||  Long Beach, CA
|-
|Loss||  style="text-align:center;"|7-5||  Abmar Barbosa|| Points (0-11) ||rowspan=2| IBJJF Pan Championship||rowspan=2| -82kg||rowspan=2|Gi||  || rowspan=2| Long Beach, CA
|-
|Win|| style="text-align:center;"|7-4||  Rodrigo Costa|| Submission (armbar) || 
|-
|Loss|| style="text-align:center;"|6-4 ||  Sergio Moraes|| Points (0-7) || IBJJF World Championship|| -82kg||Gi||  ||  Long Beach, CA
|-
|Loss||  style="text-align:center;"|6-3||  Marcelo Garcia|| Submission (guillotine choke) || rowspan=2|ADCC World Championship || rowspan=2|-77kg|| rowspan=2|Nogi|| rowspan=2| || rowspan=2| Barcelona
|-
|Win|| style="text-align:center;"|6-2||  Enrico Cocco|| Submission (rear naked choke)
|-
|Loss||  style="text-align:center;"|5-2||  Lucas Leite|| Points (0-7) ||rowspan=4| IBJJF Pan Championship||rowspan=4| -82kg||rowspan=4|Gi||rowspan=3|  || rowspan=4| Long Beach, CA
|-
|Win|| style="text-align:center;"|5-1||  Carlos Ferreira|| Submission (footlock)
|-
|Win|| style="text-align:center;"|4-1||  Abmar Barbosa|| Submission (kneebar)
|-
|Win|| style="text-align:center;"|3-1||  Nakapan Phungephorn || Submission (armbar) ||
|-
|Win||  style="text-align:center;"|2-1||  Pedro Bessa|| Submission (guillotine choke) ||rowspan=2| IBJJF European Open||rowspan=2| -82kg||rowspan=2|Gi||rowspan=2|  || rowspan=2| Lisbon
|-
|Win||  style="text-align:center;"|1-1||  Yan Cabral|| Submission (choke)
|-
|Loss|| style="text-align:center;"|0-1 ||  Sergio Moraes|| Submission (bow & arrow choke) || IBJJF World Championship|| -82kg||Gi||  ||  Long Beach, CA
|colspan=9 style="text-align:center;" | Source
|-

Mixed martial arts record 

|-
|Loss
|align=center|5–1
|Cub Swanson
|Decision (unanimous)
|UFC Fight Night: Joanna vs. Waterson
|
|align=center|3
|align=center|5:00
|Tampa, Florida, United States
|
|-
|Win
|align=center| 5–0
|Alex Caceres
|Submission (rear-naked choke)
|UFC on ESPN: Ngannou vs. Velasquez
|
|align=center| 1
|align=center| 2:06
|Phoenix, Arizona, United States
|
|-
|Win
|align=center| 4–0
|Tatsuya Kawajiri
|Submission (rear-naked choke)
| Rizin World Grand-Prix 2016: Final Round
|
|align=center| 2
|align=center| 2:04
| Saitama, Japan
|
|-
|Win
|align=center| 3–0
|Hideo Tokoro
|Submission (rear-naked choke)
| Rizin World Grand-Prix 2016: First Round
|
|align=center| 1
|align=center| 9:45
| Saitama, Japan
|
|-
|Win
|align=center| 2–0
|Asen Yamamoto
|Submission (triangle choke)
|Rizin Fighting Federation 2
|
|align=center| 1
|align=center| 4:58
|Tokyo, Japan
|
|-
|Win
|align=center| 1–0
|Hyung Soo-Kim
|Submission (armbar)
|Real Fighting Championship: Real 1
|
|align=center| 1
|align=center| 1:05
|Tokyo, Japan
|
|-
|colspan=10 style="text-align:center;" | Source
|-

Personal life 
When not competing, Gracie taught jiu-jitsu at his school in Culver City, California and helped run his father's association. In January 2021, Gracie announced that he was closing his longtime academy and relocating to Montana to open a new BJJ school in response to the Covid-19 restrictions in place in California. Gracie has stated to various media that he believes in the flat Earth conspiracy theory.

Notes

References

External links 

1988 births
Living people
Brazilian practitioners of Brazilian jiu-jitsu
People awarded a black belt in Brazilian jiu-jitsu
Featherweight mixed martial artists
Mixed martial artists utilizing Brazilian jiu-jitsu
Mixed martial artists utilizing judo
Brazilian male judoka
Brazilian people of Scottish descent
Sportspeople from Rio de Janeiro (city)
Kron
Ultimate Fighting Championship male fighters
World Brazilian Jiu-Jitsu Championship medalists
Flat Earth proponents
American mixed martial artists of Brazilian descent
Brazilian jiu-jitsu practitioners who have competed in MMA (men)